Always Foreign is the third studio album by american emo band The World Is a Beautiful Place & I Am No Longer Afraid to Die. It was released on September 29, 2017 through Epitaph Records.

Track listing

Critical reception 

Always Foreign was well received by contemporary music critics. At review aggregator site Metacritic, which assigns a normalized rating out of 100 to reviews from critics, the album received a score of 80 out of 100, indicating "generally favorable reviews" based on 8 music critic's reviews.

Personnel 
The following individuals were credited with the production, artwork, and composition of the album.

TWIABP
 Josh Cyr — Bass, Synthesizer
 Steven Buttery — Drums, Percussion
 Chris Teti — Guitar, Synthesizer
 David Bello — Vocals
 Katie Dvorak — Keyboard, Synthesizer, Vocals
 Dylan Balliett — Guitar, Vocals
 Tyler Bussey — Banjo, Guitar, Synthesizer, Vocals

Production and recording
 Dylan Balliett — Artwork, Photography
 Johnny Fabrizio — Back Cover Photo, Cover Photo
 Jason Link — Layout
 Chris Teti — Engineer, Producer, Programming
 Christopher Yeterian — Assistant Engineer

Additional musicians
 Armand Aromin — Violin
 Gary Buttery — Tuba
 Matt Hull — Trumpet
 Eric G. Stilwell — Trombone
 Chad Matheny — Electronics, Vocals
 Bernard Parsons — Vocals

Charting

References

External links 
 

The World Is a Beautiful Place & I Am No Longer Afraid to Die albums
2017 albums
Epitaph Records albums